The Golden Eshelon is a 1959 Soviet war film directed by Ilya Gurin.

Plot 
The film takes place in 1919 in Siberia, during the civil war. Kolchak wants to take gold out of Russia. The Bolsheviks are doing everything possible to prevent it.

Cast 
 Vasiliy Shukshin as Andrey Nizovtsev (as V. Shukshin)
 Elena Dobronravova as Nadya (as Ye. Dobronrarova)
 Harijs Liepins as István (as G. Liepins)
 Pavel Usovnichenko as Aleksey Bilinkin (as P. Usovnichenko)
 Stepan Krylov as Nikanor Ivanovich (as S. Krylov)
 Valentina Belyaeva as Serafima Ivanovna (as V. Belyayeva)
 Arkadi Trusov as Lipat Korneyevich (as A. Trusov)
 Syui Sao-Chzhun as Li Chan

References

External links 
 

1959 films
1950s Russian-language films
Soviet drama films
1959 drama films